Podkraj pri Zagorju is a settlement in the Municipality of Zagorje ob Savi in central Slovenia. It lies on the right bank of Medija Creek, between Zagorje and Kisovec. The area is part of the traditional region of Upper Carniola. It is now included with the rest of the municipality in the Central Sava Statistical Region.

Name
The name of the settlement was changed from Podkraj to Podkraj pri Zagorju in 1953.

References

External links
Podkraj pri Zagorju on Geopedia

Populated places in the Municipality of Zagorje ob Savi